Stephen Lynch was a member of the Order of Saint Francis.

Born in Galway sometime in the first half of the 17th century, he studied in Rome and became a Franciscan. He returned to Ireland, perhaps in the 1640s, and was listed as one of the friars banished from the Franciscan Convent of Galway in 1652. His subsequent fate is unknown.

He was also known as Stephanus a Galvia.

See also

 The Tribes of Galway

Bibliography

 Promptuarium Scotisticum, i, ii, Rome.

References

 Galway authors: a contribution towards a biographical and bibliographical index, with an essay on the history and literature in Galway, Helen Maher, Galway County Libraries, 1976, p. 107. .
 The Tribes of Galway:1124-1642, Adrian Martyn, Galway, 2016.

People from County Galway
Irish writers
Year of death unknown
Year of birth unknown